A list of people associated with Wolfson College, Oxford. This includes former students, Fellows and Presidents of the college.

Former students

 Gertrud Seidmann, oldest Oxford student who was awarded a Certificate of Graduate Attainment at the age 91.

Science
 Michael Butler, Professor of Computer Science at the University of Southampton, UK
 Dame Kay Davies, Human Geneticist
 Richard Ellis, extragalactic astronomer, Steele Professor at Caltech and former Director, Institute of Astronomy, Cambridge
 Artur Ekert, one of the pioneers of quantum cryptography, and winner of the Maxwell and Hughes medals, and the Descartes Prize
 Alison Gopnik, Professor of Psychology, Affiliate Professor of Philosophy, University of California at Berkeley
 Michael Hinchey, Irish computer scientist, Director at the Irish Software Engineering Research Centre (Lero), University of Limerick, Ireland
 Nigel Hitchin,  British mathematician, winner of the Sylvester Medal
 Michele Mosca, quantum scientist known for his work on quantum algorithms and NMR quantum computation
 James R. Norris, mathematician working in probability theory and stochastic analysis, Professor of Stochastic Analysis in the Statistical Laboratory, University of Cambridge
 Tim Palmer FRS, Climate scientist at the University of Oxford
 Nicolaas Adrianus Rupke, a Dutch historian of science, who began his academic career as a marine geologist
 Michael Spivey, British computer scientist at the University of Oxford, who wrote an Oberon-2 compiler.

Law
 Karim Asad Ahmad Khan, Prosecutor in the UN International Criminal Tribunals for the Former Yugoslavia and Rwanda, counsel before Special Courts in East Timor and Sierra Leone
 Dame Hazel Genn, authority on civil justice
 The Hon. Justice Francisco Rezek, distinguished Brazilian jurist and member of the International Court of Justice and formerly Foreign Minister of Brazil

History & literature
 Joe Andrew, Professor of Russian Literature at Keele University
 Henry Hardy, author and editor, publisher of Isaiah Berlin's papers
 Josef W. Meri, specialist in Islam in the pre-modern period, Islamic cultural and social history
 Iain Pears, popular British novelist, art historian

Politics & government
 Tony Buti, Australian politician and Australian Labor Party member of the Western Australian Legislative Assembly
 Wes Moore, Governor of Maryland, US state
 Tom Phillips (diplomat), Commandant of the Royal College of Defence Studies.
 Mehdi Hashemi Rafsanjani, businessman, former Iranian government official, and the fourth child of Ayatollah Akbar Hashemi Rafsanjani, former President of Iran
 Nafisa Shah, Member of Pakistan's National Assembly (MNA), Chairperson of Pakistan's National Commission for Human Development, nominated for a collective Nobel Peace Prize under "1000 Women for Peace" category.
 Simon Upton, formerly Minister of Health, Environment and Science and Technology and member of the National Party
 Mike Woodin, former principal speaker for the Green Party of England and Wales (later Fellow of Balliol)

Business
Don Elder, New Zealand engineer and businessman, CEO of the New Zealand mining and energy company Solid Energy.

Fellows

 Samson Abramsky, computer scientist and developer of domain theory in logic form, game semantics and categorical quantum mechanics
 John Addis, former UK ambassador to Laos, the Philippines and China
 Leonie Archer, historian and authority on women in Jewish antiquity
 Isaiah Berlin, regarded as one of the twentieth century's most influential liberal philosophers
 Kanti Bajpai, Former Headmaster, The Doon School, India
 John Barnes, developer of the Ada programming language
 William Bradshaw, Baron Bradshaw, Member of the House of Lords
 Donald Broadbent, experimental psychologist
 Sebastian Brock, expert in Syriac language
 Amit Chaudhuri, novelist
 David Dabydeen, Guyana's Ambassador Plenipotentiary and Extraordinaire to China, from 2010 to 2015
 Simon Digby, oriental scholar
 Anthony Epstein, discovered the Epstein-Barr virus
 Robin Gandy, mathematician and logician
 Raymond Hoffenberg, endocrinologist and medical scientist and prominent opponent of apartheid in South Africa
 Tony Hoare, computer scientist, developer of Quicksort the widely used sorting algorithm
 Dorothy Hodgkin, British Chemist and Nobel Prize winner
Avishai Margalit, philosopher, Hebrew University of Jerusalem
 Roger Moorey, British archeologist and keeper of antiquities at the Ashmolean Museum in Oxford
 Pat Nuttall, expert in tick-borne diseases
 Gareth Roberts, physicist and influential figure in shaping British policy on the sciences
 Sumit Sarkar, Indian historian, former Professor of history, Delhi University
 Erich Wolf Segal, American author and screenwriter, wrote the screenplay for The Beatles' 1968 motion picture Yellow Submarine
 Steven Schwartz, Vice Chancellor of Macquarie University in Sydney, Australia
 Jon Stallworthy, Professor Emeritus of English, University of Oxford, UK
 Bryan Sykes, world-renowned human geneticist
 Niko Tinbergen, Dutch ethologist and Nobel prize winner
 Géza Vermes, Hungarian Jewish historian of ancient Judaism and early Christianity, authority on the Dead Sea Scrolls and the historical Jesus

Presidents
Isaiah Berlin, 1967–1975
Henry Fisher, 1975–85
Raymond Hoffenberg, 1985–93
Jim Kennedy, (acting), 1993–1994
David Smith, 1994–2000
Jon Stallworthy, (acting), 2000
Gareth Roberts, 2000–2007
Jon Stallworthy, (acting), 2007–2008
Hermione Lee, 2008–2017
Philomen Probert, (acting), 2017–2018
Tim Hitchens, 2018–present

References

Wolfson
People associated with Wolfson College, Oxford